The PSA Men's Awards are presented annually by the Professional Squash Association, the organization which organizes the men's world squash circuit.

2005-present

Player of The Year

Young Player of the Year

See also
 Official Men's Squash World Ranking
 List of PSA number 1 ranked players

References

Squash (sport)
Squash records and statistics
Squash awards